These are the Billboard magazine R&B albums that reached number one in 1990.

Chart history

See also
1990 in music
R&B number-one hits of 1990 (USA)

1990